Pavel Bucha (born 11 March 1998) is a Czech professional footballer who plays as a midfielder for Viktoria Plzeň in the Fortuna Liga.

Club career
He made his league debut in Slavia's Fortuna Liga 0–1 loss at Jihlava on 17 February 2018. In June 2018, he was sent back to the Slavia junior squad following his refusal to extend his contract.  In July, Bucha terminated his contract with Slavia Prague on the grounds that removing him from the first team had constituted a breach of contract by the club. Immediately after, he signed a four-year deal with rivals Viktoria Plzeň.

International career 
In October 2021 he was called up to the senior Czech Republic squad and was on the bench against Belarus.

Career statistics

Club

References

External links
 
 
 Pavel Bucha official international statistics
 
 Pavel Bucha profile on the SK Slavia Prague official website

Czech footballers
Czech Republic youth international footballers
1998 births
Living people
Czech First League players
SK Slavia Prague players
FK Mladá Boleslav players
FC Viktoria Plzeň players
Association football midfielders
People from Mělník District
Czech Republic under-21 international footballers
Sportspeople from the Central Bohemian Region